Touch Yer Toes was a demo album released by the group Simon Says, an alternative metal band from Sacramento, California. Touch Yer Toes, which was released in 1994, is one of the few smaller demo albums Simon Says had recorded prior to the release of their first two full-length albums in 1997. During the time the album was released, the band played high school circuits as well as Sacramento all-ages clubs. This demo album featured Shane Ozmun on bass prior to the joining of Mike Arrieta in 1995. The album was produced by Simon Says and Jerry Jennings Productions and was recorded at Twelve Note Studio in Fair Oaks, California.

Packaging and artwork
The Touch Yer Toes demo was released on an audio cassette tape with titles 1 and 2 on one side and titles 3 and 4 on the reverse. For at least some of the released copies, the labeling scheme of "side A" and "side B" or any branding or track information was not present on the cassette tape itself, while the album cover art had a simple black and white color scheme with band and album information.

Track listing

Members
Matthew Franks - vocals
Zac Diebels - guitar
Shane Ozmun - bass
Mike Johnston - drums

References

1994 albums
Demo albums